"Move On Up" is a song by Curtis Mayfield from his 1970 debut album, Curtis. Nearly nine minutes long on the album version, it was released as a single in the United States, but failed to chart. An edited version of the song spent 10 weeks in the top 50 of the UK Singles Chart in 1971, peaking at number 12, and it has become a soul classic over the years. In 2021, it was listed at No. 474 on Rolling Stones "Top 500 Best Songs of All Time".

Certifications

Destination version
In 1979, Destination recorded a medley, incorporating "Keep on Pushing", a 1964 hit by the Impressions, also written by Mayfield. Along with the tracks "Up Up Up" and "Destination's Theme", "Move On Up" hit number one on the disco chart for four weeks.  It peaked at number 68 on the soul singles chart.

Other cover versions and sampling
In 1979, disco trio Destination recorded a medley, incorporating "Keep on Pushing", a 1964 hit by the Impressions, also written by Mayfield. Along with the tracks "Up Up Up" and "Destination's Theme", "Move On Up" hit number one on the disco chart for four weeks.  It peaked at number sixty-eight on the soul singles chart.

The Jam, an English rock band active in the late 1970s to the early 1980s, released a version of the song on an extended play record in 1982.

Kentucky-based jam-band My Morning Jacket frequently covers the song in their live shows.

Just Blaze heavily sampled the song for Kanye West's 2006 single "Touch the Sky", using a slowed-down version of the horns.

Argentine ska and rock band Los Fabulosos Cadillacs covered "Move On Up" in their sixteenth album, El Arte de la Elegancia de LFC (The Art of Elegance of LFC), released in 2009. The song was retitled as "Vamos Ya! (Move on Up)"; "¡Vamos ya!" means "Let's Go Now!" in Castilian Spanish.

In popular culture
English football club Arsenal adopted the song as a popular post-game anthem at their Emirates Stadium.

The song appears on the soundtrack of the 2002 British film Bend It Like Beckham with Parminder Nagra and Keira Knightley.

It has been used by Joe Biden following the end of his speeches during his 2020 presidential campaign.

References

1970 songs
1971 singles
1979 singles
Curtis Mayfield songs
Song recordings produced by Curtis Mayfield
Songs written by Curtis Mayfield